Dairyland is a dairy business that operates in Port Coquitlam, British Columbia. Now owned by Saputo Dairy Foods Canada, Dairyland was originally an operating arm of BC dairy farmers' cooperatives and was legally named Agrifoods International Cooperative Ltd. at the time of the sale of the majority of its assets to Saputo Incorporated. Its products are sold across Canada.

Dairyworld Foods, a Canadian-based dairy cooperative, was purchased by Saputo Inc. in 2001. Dairyworld Foods (previously known as Agrifoods International Cooperative Ltd.), produces milk and a range of dairy and other food products which are sold across Canada at large retailers. Dairyworld was created in 1992 as a result of a merger of Dairyland in BC and Alpha and Nu-Maid in Alberta. In November 2009, Dairyland products were replaced in Ontario by Neilson after Saputo's acquisition of the William Neilson brand from George Weston Limited.

Producers 
Fraser Valley Milk Producers Association, Northern Alberta Dairy Producers, Central Alberta Dairy Producers, and Dairy Producers Cooperative Ltd. were farmer-owned co-operative creameries and dairy marketers, formed in the early 1900s. They produced dairy products under regional brand in their own home areas. For example, FVMPA produced Dairyland and Pacific milk products, NADP (Northern Alberta Dairy Pool) produced Nu-Maid milk, and CADP produced Alpha brand milk, and all three shared a joint venture for Armstrong processed cheese in Alberta. Dairyland also shared a joint venture Ultima Foods with Agropur to produce and market Yoplait yogurt in Canada. There were a number of mergers and acquisitions in the early 1990s, including Dairyland acquiring the mainland assets of Palm Dairy of Vancouver (c. 1928), Flowerlea dairy in Brampton, Ontario, and another small dairy in Winnipeg. In 1992, FVMPA, NADP, and CADP merged to form Dairyworld, In 1996,Dairy Producers Cooperative Ltd. joined the entity, adding business in Saskatchewan and Manitoba, as well as gaining a small foothold in Ontario.

In 2001, Agrifoods International sold all of its processing and brands, except Ultima Foods, to Saputo Inc. Agrifoods International continues to exist but no longer markets its own products.

References

External links 
 
 Saputo Dairy products
 IT article on Dairyworld

Food and drink companies of Canada
Dairy products companies of Canada
Food and drink companies established in 1992
1992 establishments in Canada
Companies based in Burnaby
Former cooperatives of Canada